Justin Parks Roper (born July 28, 1987) is a former American football quarterback who played one season in the Arena Football League (AFL) with the Chicago Rush and Orlando Predators. He played college football at Oregon and Montana.

Early years
Roper lettered in football, basketball, track and field and swimming for the Buford High School Wolves of Buford, Georgia. He was ranked as one of the top 28 quarterbacks in the country after compiling a 12–1 record and an 8-AA league championship in 2005.

College career
Roper was redshirted by the Oregon Ducks of the University of Oregon in 2006. He made his first collegiate start in the 2007 Sun Bowl on December 31, 2007 against the South Florida Bulls, throwing for four touchdowns and leading the Ducks to a 56–21 victory. He finished his career at the University of Oregon with nine touchdown passes and 952 passing yards.

Roper transferred to the University of Montana in 2009, where he played football for the Montana Grizzlies. He also played basketball for the Grizzlies.

Statistics

Sources:

Professional career
Roper was rated the 25th best quarterback in the 2011 NFL Draft by NFLDraftScout.com.

He was signed by the Chicago Rush of the AFL on September 30, 2011. He was traded to the Orlando Predators on April 2, 2012. Roper threw for 15 touchdowns and 815 passing yards for the Predators in 2012.

Coaching career
Roper began his coaching career as the running backs coach at the University of Findlay in 2013. He helped running back Daiquone Ford record 1,789 yards and a school record 24 rushing touchdowns while earning All-American honors. Roper was quarterbacks coach at Valdosta State University from 2014 to 2015. On March 1, 2016, he was named the offensive coordinator and quarterbacks coach at Slippery Rock University of Pennsylvania.

References

External links
Just Sports Stats

1987 births
Living people
People from Buford, Georgia
Sportspeople from the Atlanta metropolitan area
Players of American football from Georgia (U.S. state)
American football quarterbacks
Oregon Ducks football players
Montana Grizzlies football players
Chicago Rush players
Orlando Predators players
Basketball players from Georgia (U.S. state)
American men's basketball players
Montana Grizzlies basketball players
Coaches of American football from Georgia (U.S. state)
Findlay Oilers football coaches
Valdosta State Blazers football coaches
Slippery Rock football coaches